Re-Sfaction 2 is a remix album released by DJ/producer Benny Benassi in December 2005. It contains remixes that he has done over the past few years.

Track listing
Robbie Rivera - "Funk A Faction" (Benny Benassi Mix) – 4:56
Moby - "Beautiful" (Benny Benassi Remix) – 7:01
The Biz - "Stop Go" (Original Extended) – 5:55
David Guetta - "In Love with Myself" (Benny Benassi Remix) – 6:32
Benassi Bros. featuring Dhany - "Every Single Day" (Original Extended) – 3:41
Equaleyes - "9-Teen" (Sfaction Mix) – 5:41
Felix Da Housecat - "Ready 2 Wear" (Benny Benassi Mix)– 6:16
Benassi Bros. featuring Dhany - "Rocket in the Sky" (Dub) – 6:27
The Bravery - "Unconditional" (Benny Benassi Remix) – 6:01
Digitally Stoned People - "Warman Whoreman" (Mix. Bat 67 Remix) – 5:50
Rava - "Not Tin Groove" (Bat 67 Extended Remix) – 6:15
Benny Benassi presents The Biz - "Megamix" – 6:35
Benny Benassi - "B-Tone" – 1:00

Benny Benassi albums
2006 remix albums